At the 1908 Summer Olympics in London, two diving events were contested, both for men only. The competition was held on Tuesday July 14, 1908 and Friday July 24, 1908. While the competitive events were restricted to men only, an exhibition was performed by two women on July 18.

Medal summary

The events are labelled as 3 metre springboard and 10 metre platform by the International Olympic Committee, and appeared on the 1908 Official Report as high diving and fancy diving. The high diving event included dives from both 10 metre and 5 metre platforms, while the fancy diving included dives from 3 metre and 1 metre springboards.

Participating nations
A total of 39 divers from 9 nations competed at the London Games:

Medal table

Notes

References
 
 

 
1908 Summer Olympics events
1908
1908 in water sports
Diving competitions in the United Kingdom